Carl or Karl Hill may refer to:

 Carl Alexander Gibson-Hill (1911–1963), British physician, naturalist and museum curator
 Carl Fredrik Hill (1849–1911), Swedish painter
 Carl McClellan Hill (1907–1995), African American educator and academic administrator
 Delmas Carl Hill (1906–1989), American judge
 Karl Hill (1831–1893), German baritone opera singer
 Karl Hill (musician) (born 1975), American rock and roll guitarist and drummer, member of Government Issue

See also 
 Charles Hill (disambiguation)
 Hill (surname)